Camponotus laevissimus (formerly C. laevigatus), the giant carpenter ant, is a species of carpenter ant native to western Canada, the United States, and Mexico. Workers measure between 7 and 13 millimeters in length.  General coloration is shiny black with a blue tint; The body is covered in short white hairs.  The species, which is primarily diurnal, tends to make its nests by hollowing out redwoods.  It feeds on the pupae of the western spruce budworm.

References

 

laevissimus
Insects described in 1858
Insects of North America